Patrick Neville Durlacher (17 March 1903 – 26 February 1971) was an English cricketer.  Durlacher was a right-handed batsman.  He was born in Paddington, London, the son of Neville Durlacher and his Irish-born wife Ruth Dyas.  He was educated at Wellington College, where he represented the school cricket team.  It was for the college that he was part of the Wellington Rackets pair who won the Public Schools Championship in 1921.

He played for Buckinghamshire in the Minor Counties Championship in 1920, which turned out to be a successful season for him, which paved the way for him to make his first-class debut for Middlesex the following season.

His first-class debut came against Somerset in 1921, although he was an infrequent fixture in the Middlesex side, playing just 4 further matches up till 1923.  In his 5 first-class appearances, he scored 43 runs at a batting average of 10.75, with a high score of 27.

He later studied at Cambridge University, despite not representing the University in cricket, Durlacher nevertheless won a Cambridge Blue in cross country running. 

In 1935, Durlacher was listed in the London Gazette as living in Stoke Green, Buckinghamshire and making a claim to his late father's estate.  His sister, Nora Durlacher, was a tennis player who appeared in the 1919 Irish Lawn Tennis Championships doubles.  Durlacher died suddenly while fishing in Ireland on 26 February 1971.

References

External links
Patrick Durlacher at ESPNcricinfo
Patrick Durlacher at CricketArchive

1903 births
1971 deaths
People from Paddington
Cricketers from Greater London
Free Foresters cricketers
English people of Irish descent
People educated at Wellington College, Berkshire
English cricketers
Buckinghamshire cricketers
Middlesex cricketers